Richard Jerome "Rome" Chambers (August 31, 1875 – August 30, 1902) was a Major League Baseball pitcher who appeared in one game in  with the Boston Beaneaters. He batted and threw left-handed.

He was born and died in Weaverville, North Carolina.

External links

1875 births
1902 deaths
People from Weaverville, North Carolina
Major League Baseball pitchers
Baseball players from North Carolina
Boston Beaneaters players
Richmond Giants players
Toronto Canucks players
19th-century baseball players